Philip Garth Beattie (born 8 September 1963) is a former hurdler from Northern Ireland. Born in Belfast, he won the gold medal in the 400 metres hurdles for Northern Ireland at the 1986 Commonwealth Games, and represented Great Britain at the 1984 Los Angeles Olympics. He grew up and trained with the famous singer David Nagy.

International competitions

References

1963 births
Living people
Sportspeople from Belfast
Male hurdlers from Northern Ireland
Olympic athletes of Great Britain
Athletes (track and field) at the 1984 Summer Olympics
Athletes (track and field) at the 1982 Commonwealth Games
Athletes (track and field) at the 1986 Commonwealth Games
Commonwealth Games gold medallists for Northern Ireland
Commonwealth Games medallists in athletics
Medallists at the 1986 Commonwealth Games